Fotyen Tesfay (born 17 February 1998) is an Ethiopian long-distance runner. In 2019, she competed in the senior women's race at the 2019 IAAF World Cross Country Championships held in Aarhus, Denmark. She finished in 11th place.

In 2016, she finished in 4th place in the women's 3000 metres event at the 2016 IAAF World U20 Championships held in Bydgoszcz, Poland. In 2016, she won the Great Ethiopian Run held in Addis Ababa, Ethiopia.

In 2017, she competed in the junior women's race at the 2017 IAAF World Cross Country Championships held in Kampala, Uganda. She finished in 6th place.

In 2020, she won the 63rd edition of the Campaccio held in San Giorgio su Legnano, Italy.

References

External links 
 

Living people
1998 births
Place of birth missing (living people)
Ethiopian female long-distance runners
Ethiopian female cross country runners
21st-century Ethiopian women